This list of Australian female boxing champions is a table showing the female boxers who have won the Australian professional championship. The title has been administered by the Australian National Boxing Federation since 2002. A champion will often voluntarily relinquish the title in order to fight for a higher-ranked championship, such as the world. Where the date on which a champion relinquished the title is unclear.

Middleweight

Super-welterweight

Welterweight

Super-lightweight

Lightweight

Super-featherweight

Featherweight

Super-bantamweight

Bantamweight

Super-flyweight

See also

List of New Zealand female boxing champions
List of Australian heavyweight boxing champions
List of Australian cruiserweight boxing champions
List of Australian middleweight boxing champions
List of New Zealand heavyweight boxing champions
List of New Zealand cruiserweight boxing champions
List of New Zealand light heavyweight boxing champions
List of New Zealand super middleweight boxing champions
List of New Zealand middleweight boxing champions
List of New Zealand super welterweight boxing champions
List of New Zealand welterweight boxing champions
List of New Zealand super lightweight boxing champions
List of New Zealand lightweight boxing champions
List of New Zealand super featherweight boxing champions
List of New Zealand featherweight boxing champions
List of New Zealand bantamweight boxing champions
Boxing in Australia

References

External links
Boxrec
Australian National Boxing Federation
Aus-Boxing Australian boxing news website

Female
Australia
 
 
Lists of Australian sportswomen